El Camino (Spanish for "The Path") is an unincorporated community in Tehama County, in the U.S. state of California.

History
The community took its name from an early ranch, the "El Camino Colony".

References

Unincorporated communities in Tehama County, California